The 1894 County Championship was the fifth officially organised running of the County Championship, and ran from 14 May to 30 August 1894. Surrey reclaimed the title that Yorkshire had taken from them the previous season.

Table
 One point was awarded for a win, and one point was taken away for each loss.

Leading averages

References

External links
1894 County Championship  at CricketArchive

1894 in English cricket
County Championship seasons
County